Por Ti (For You) is a Mexican telenovela that aired in 2002 on TV Azteca's Azteca 13. It starred Leonardo Garcia and Ana de la Reguera as protagonists.

Cast

Main protagonists
Leonardo Garcia
Ana de la Reguera

Special participation
Francisco de la O

Special appearance
Angelica Aragon

Leading actors
Luis Felipe Tovar 
and  Regina Torne
with Fernando Becerril as Arturo
Lolo Navarro as Tomasa
and  Claudia Islas as Virginia
Season 2
Alvaro Guerrero

Other actors
Gloria Peralta
Rodrigo Cachero
Andrea Noli
Gabriel Porras
Vanessa Ciangherotti
Xavier Massimi
Tamara Monsserat
Mariana Torres
Season 2 onwards
Fabian Corres
Ana la Salvia
Alejandra Ley
Yul Bürkle
Mariana Isla
Luis Arrieta

Infant talent
Carlos Hays
Sugey

Special guest stars
Hector Arredondo
Jorge Carles
and Rafael Sanchez Navarro

Cast trivia
In 2004, a number of actors of this series reappeared in TV Azteca's Belinda which stars Mariana Torres and Leonardo Garcia as main protagonists. The other actors included: Rodrigo Cachero, Luis Arrieta, Tamara Monserrat, Regina Torne and others.

In the same year also, some actors reappeared in TV Azteca's La Heredera. They are Andrea Noli, Fabian Corres, Hector Arredondo and others.

In 2006, Carlos Hays, Alvaro Guerrero, and Luis Felipe Tovar appeared in Montecrsto with Silvia Navarro as heroine.

Theme song

Doy La Vida Por Un Beso
Singers
Zeze di Camargo & Luciano
Writers
Cecilio Nena
Antonio Luiz
Lalo Prado
Adaptation
Manny Benito
Editor
Warner Chapel

Y Llegaste Tu
Season 3 onwards
Performed by: Sin Bandera
Written by: Leonel Garcia  Noel Schajris

References

External links

TV Azteca telenovelas
2002 telenovelas
2002 Mexican television series debuts
2002 Mexican television series endings
Mexican telenovelas
Mexican television series based on Argentine television series
Spanish-language telenovelas